Alassane-Méba Diaby (born 6 January 1995) is a professional footballer who plays as a defender. Born in France, he represents Mali at international level. He is a product of the Monaco academy.

Career
Diaby was born in Saint-Denis, France. He signed his first professional contract with Belgian club Lierse.

On 29 June 2018, Diaby signed with Bulgarian club Septemvri Sofia.

In June 2019, Diaby signed for Pau FC for the 2019–20 season. He stayed in Championnat National for the 2020–21 season, signing with Quevilly-Rouen in June 2020.

International career
Diaby was born and raised in France and is of Malian and Ivorian descent. At international level, he was a France youth international having represented his nation at under-19 level. He was called up to the Mali national under-20 football team for the 2016 Toulon Tournament, and made his debut in a 1–0 loss to the Czech Republic U20s.

Diaby made his debut for the senior Mali national football team in a friendly 1–0 loss to Nigeria on 27 May 2016.

References

External links
 

Living people
1995 births
Sportspeople from Saint-Denis, Seine-Saint-Denis
Association football central defenders
Citizens of Mali through descent
Malian footballers
Mali under-20 international footballers
Mali international footballers
Malian expatriate footballers
French footballers
France youth international footballers
Challenger Pro League players
Süper Lig players
First Professional Football League (Bulgaria) players
Championnat National players
Lierse S.K. players
Ankaraspor footballers
FC Septemvri Sofia players
Pau FC players
US Quevilly-Rouen Métropole players
Expatriate footballers in Belgium
Expatriate footballers in Turkey
Expatriate footballers in Bulgaria
Malian expatriate sportspeople in Belgium
Malian expatriate sportspeople in Turkey
Malian expatriate sportspeople in Bulgaria
Malian people of Ivorian descent
French expatriate sportspeople in Belgium
French expatriate sportspeople in Turkey
French expatriate sportspeople in Bulgaria
French sportspeople of Ivorian descent
French sportspeople of Malian descent
Footballers from Seine-Saint-Denis